Bruce Emerson Rampelberg (born July 21, 1942) is an American politician. He served as a Republican member of the South Dakota Senate, representing District 30, from January 11, 2011, to 2017.

Rampelberg was defeated by Lance Russell in the 2016 Republican primary.

Education
Rampelberg earned his BS in business education from the University of Montana.

Elections
2012 Rampelberg's 2010 opponent challenged him again in the June 5, 2012 Republican Primary, setting up a rematch; Rampelberg won with 1,830 votes (57.78%) Rampelberg was unopposed for the November 6, 2012 General election, winning with 8,686 votes.
2010 When Senate District 30 incumbent Republican Senator Gordon Howie ran for Governor of South Dakota, Rampelberg ran in the June 8, 2010 Republican Primary and won with 2,011 votes (50.2%) including an election recount which did not change the result; he was unopposed for the November 2, 2010 General election, winning with 7,925 votes.  His campaign site says to elect Rampelberg, "...to uphold conservative Republican values...."

References

External links
Official page at the South Dakota Legislature
Campaign site

Bruce Rampelberg at Ballotpedia
Bruce Rampelberg at the National Institute on Money in State Politics

People from Iowa
1942 births
Living people
Republican Party members of the South Dakota House of Representatives
Politicians from Rapid City, South Dakota
Republican Party South Dakota state senators
University of Montana alumni
21st-century American politicians